Etorofus  is a genus of beetles in the family Cerambycidae, containing the following species:

 Etorofus anthracinus  (LeConte, 1875)
 Etorofus deletus (LeConte, 1850)
 Etorofus nemurensis Matsushita 1933
 Etorofus obliteratus (Haldeman, 1847)
 Etorofus plagiferus  (LeConte, 1873) 
 Etorofus plebejus (Randall, 1838)
 Etorofus propinquus (Bland, 1865)
 Etorofus pubescens (Fabricius, 1787) 
 Etorofus soror (LeConte, 1873)
 Etorofus subhamatus (Randall, 1838)
 Etorofus vitiosus (LeConte, 1854)'.

References 

Lepturinae